Adiantum philippense, (Goyali Lota, Kalijhant in Bengali: গয়ালী লতা, Hamsapadi, Kitamata, Tripadika in Sanskrit, Jarigida in Kannada, Hamsapadi in Hindi ), also known as walking maidenhair fern, or black maidenhair, is a species of maidenhair fern (Adiantum) that is widely distributed through the southern hemisphere, notably Asia, Africa, and Madagascar.

Taxonomy
The species was named by Carl Linnaeus in 1753. It was lectotypified by R.E.G. Pichi-Sermolli in 1957 based on an illustration by James Petiver. The identifiability of this illustration was disputed, leading some authorities to deprecate A. philippense as a nomen dubium and use the next available name for the taxon, Adiantum lunulatum Burm.f.. Burman conferred this specific epithet based on its half-moon shaped pinnae. However, Christopher Fraser-Jenkins located the original material and drawing of the lectotype sent to Petiver by Georg Joseph Kamel in the Sloane Herbarium, making clear the application of the name A. philippense.

Description 
Adiantum philippense grows in a creeping or semi-erect position. Its fronds are arched and tufted. The fern is notably overall very glabrous and smooth. It grows on streambanks, often on rocks in forests and woodland.

Distribution
Adiantum philippense can be found across south-east Asia. It inhabits tropical areas in Bangladesh, India, Nepal, Thailand, and Cambodia.

Gallery

References

External links
 

philippense
Flora of tropical Asia
Plants described in 1753
Taxa named by Carl Linnaeus